The action of 2 May 1707, also known as Beachy Head, was a naval battle of the War of the Spanish Succession in which a French squadron under Claude de Forbin intercepted a large British convoy escorted by three ships of the line, under Commodore Baron Wylde. The action began when three French ships, the Grifon, Blackoal and Dauphine, grappled , killing her captain, George Clements, and taking her. Claude Forbin's 60-gun Mars next attacked  and, when joined by the French ships Blackoal and Fidèle, killed the Captain Edward Acton, and took her too. The convoy was scattered and the last British escort, badly hit and with 12 feet of water in her wells, managed to escape by running ashore near Dungeness, from where she was carried the next day into the Downs.

The French took 21 merchant ships, besides the two 70-gun ships of the line, and carried them all into Dunkirk.

Action 
On 1 May a large outward-bound convoy for the West Indies, under the protection of three ships of the line, sailed from the Downs and being six leagues to the westward of Beachy, they fell in with the French squadron from Dunkirk, commanded by Claude de Forbin. This squadron consisted of 7 sail of the line and 6 privateers. The action began when 3 French ships, Griffon, Blackoal and La Dauphine, grappled HMS Hampton Court and killed Captain Clements. Commodore Wyld took five of his largest merchant ships into his line and boldly met the attack of the French ships. For two and a half hours a heavy fire was kept up on both sides; HMS Hampton Court fought desperately and was obliged to surrender. La Dauphine next vigorously attacked HMS Grafton and when joined by the French ships Blackoal and Fidele, captured her after a warm dispute of half an hour. Claude Forbin's 60-gun Mars attacked Commodore Wyld's Royal Oak. The ship having eleven feet of water in her hold, managed to escape with great loss by running ashore, from where she was carried into the Downs.

Order of battle

France 
 Mars 60 – Chevalier de Forbin, Chef de division.
 La Dauphine 56 – Comte de Roquefeuil.
 Fidèle 56 – Baron d'Arey.
 Blackoal 54 – de Tourouvre.
 Salisbury 50 – Chevalier de Vezins.
 Griffon 50  – Chevalier de Nangis.
 Protée 50 – Comte d'Illiers.

6 Privateers.

Britain 
 HMS Royal Oak 76 – Commodore Baron Wylde, Escaped.
 HMS Hampton Court 70 – Captain George Clements, Captured.
 HMS Grafton 70 – Captain Edward Acton , Captured.

55 Merchant ships.

References

Bibliography 
 Haws, Duncan; Hurst, Alexander Anthony (1985). The Maritime History of the World: A Chronological Survey of Maritime Events from 5,000 B.C. Until the Present Day. Vol I. .
 Allen, Joseph. Battles of the British Navy: from A.D. 1000 to 1840 Bell & Daldy publishing, ASIN B00087UD9S
 Troude, O. Batailles navales de la France, Vol. I.

Conflicts in 1707
Naval battles involving Great Britain
Naval battles involving France
Naval battles of the War of the Spanish Succession
1707 in France
1707 in Great Britain
18th-century military history of France